Lydden is also the name of a hamlet in the Manston, Kent civil parish

Lydden is a civil parish and small village in the Dover district of Kent, England. The Lydden Race Circuit is located between here and Wootton to the west of the village.
Lydden village consists of a triangle of 3 roads: Canterbury Road (part of the old A2 running between Dover, Canterbury and London), Stonehall and Church Lane.

Lydden is set in a steep sided valley landscape, with grazing pasture and pockets of woodland along the valley side facing north west, and the extensive Lydden and Temple Ewell Downs National Nature Reserve facing south west. The NNR is famous for its chalk grassland habitat and species including the adonis blue butterfly.

Amenities
There were two pubs in Lydden, The Lydden Bell (pictured on the right) and The Hope Inn. The former pub is thriving offering good quality food and a home to the village skittles and darts team. The Hope, however, has been shut since January 2011 partly knocked down and converted into a house, the grounds are being developed into new housing. There is also a school and a church in the village.

As of 2012 there has been a new Doctor's surgery built in Lydden, having been built to replace the former Doctor's surgery in River which has now been closed.

Governance
Lydden is part of the electoral ward called Lydden and Temple Ewell. The population of this ward at the 2011 census was 2,342.

References

2. Kent Wildlife Trust

External links

 Kent County Council – Local Government website
 Lydden Temple Ewell Reserve (Kent Wildlife Trust)
 Natural England - The national government agency who regulate National Nature Reserves

Villages in Kent
Civil parishes in Kent